Institutional customers is a term used in the financial services industry to differentiate retail customers and corporate customers from other financial institutions such as banks, insurance companies, and investment management companies.

In several jurisdictions, financial institutions may be able to enter transactions under a more lax regulatory environment than the other customer categories.
Financial services

References